Iacobeşti may refer to:

Iacobeşti, a village in Roşia Montană commune, Alba County, Romania
Iacobeşti, a village in Grănicești commune, Suceava County, Romania

See also
Iacobescu